Friedrich Bernhard Gottfried Nicolai (25 October 1793 – 4 June 1846) was a German astronomer.

Born in Braunschweig, Nicolai was educated at Göttingen. In 1812, he calculated the Euler–Mascheroni constant to 40 decimal places. In 1816, he joined the Mannheim observatory where he became the director.

The crater Nicolai on the Moon is named after him.

External links
 NASA ADS author query

1793 births
1846 deaths
Scientists from Braunschweig
People from the Duchy of Brunswick
Nicolai, Friedrich Bernhard Gottfried